Hof is a Landkreis (district) in Bavaria, Germany. It is bounded by (from the south and clockwise) the districts of Wunsiedel, Bayreuth, Kulmbach and Kronach, the states of Thuringia (district of Saale-Orla) and Saxony (district of Vogtlandkreis), and the Czech Republic. The city of Hof is an enclave within the district, as well as being the district's administrative seat.

History
Following a short regency by Kingdom of Prussia (1791–1810) the region fell to Bavaria in 1810. The district was established in 1852. In the Bavarian communal reforms of 1972 it was merged with parts of the dissolved districts Naila, Münchberg, Kronach and Rehau.

Geography
The Saxon Saale river originates in the south of the district, on the slopes of the Fichtelgebirge. From here it runs northwards, its valley separating the Fichtelgebirge in the east and the lower Frankenwald hills in the west.

Coat of arms
The coat of arms displays two lions. They are from the arms of the counties of Weida and Nuremberg, who subsequently ruled over the region in the early Middle Ages.

Towns and municipalities

References

External links

Official website (German)

 
Districts of Bavaria